Brown v. Barry, 3 U.S. (3 Dall.) 365 (1797), was a United States Supreme Court case in which the court determined the following: The suspension of a statute for a limited time is not a repeal of it.

The intention of the legislature when discovered must prevail, any rule of construction. declared by previous acts, to the contrary notwithstanding.

In an action on a bill of exchange, which had not been protested for non-payment, it is not necessary to aver in the declaration that the bill had been protested for non-acceptance.

As to bills of exchange drawn in the United States payable in Europe, the custom of merchants in this country does not ordinarily require, to recover on a protest for non-payment, that a protest for non-acceptance shall be produced, though the bills were not accepted.

Where the action is for foreign money, and its value is not averred, a verdict cures the defect.

The reason that debet for foreign money is ill, is the uncertainty of its value; and this is cured by a verdict.

References

External links
 

United States Supreme Court cases
United States Supreme Court cases of the Ellsworth Court
1797 in United States case law